Rise is an American musical drama television series created by Jason Katims, starring Josh Radnor in the lead role as Lou Mazzuchelli. The series is inspired by the 2013 book Drama High by Michael Sokolove, which focused on real-life teacher Lou Volpe and the famed theater program at Harry S Truman High School in Bucks County, Pennsylvania.

The television pilot was ordered to series by NBC on May 4, 2017, along with The Brave, making both series the first regular series orders by the network for the 2017–18 United States network television schedule. The first season consisted of 10 episodes, and debuted on March 13, 2018.

On May 11, 2018, NBC canceled the show after one season.

Cast and characters

Main
 Josh Radnor as Lou "Mr. Mazzu" Mazzuchelli, an English teacher at Stanton High who wants to reinvent the school's drama presentations. He takes over the Stanton drama club and pushes to perform Spring Awakening.
 Marley Shelton as Gail Mazzuchelli, Lou's wife who supports his plan of taking over the drama department of his school
 Rosie Perez as Tracey Wolfe, the assistant director who was previously offered the director job before being replaced by Lou, though she stays on and supports Lou
 Auliʻi Cravalho as Lilette Suarez, a high school student and member of the Stanton drama club cast in the lead role of Wendla, who has problems with her mother at home
 Damon J. Gillespie as Robbie Thorne, the starting quarterback of the Stanton football team, who is cast in the lead role of Melchior; he also visits and takes care of his mother at a hospital. 
 Shirley Rumierk as Vanessa Suarez, Lilette's mother who has an affair with the football coach and keeps secrets from her daughter
Joe Tippett as Coach Sam Strickland, the headstrong and strict Stanton football coach who values sports over the arts
 Ted Sutherland as Simon Saunders, a student born into a very religious conservative family, who is usually cast in the lead roles in the Stanton club theater productions, but later is cast in the role of Hänschen
 Amy Forsyth as Gwen Strickland, Coach Strickland's daughter and member of Stanton drama club, who has problems at home due to her father's affair; she is usually cast in the lead female roles, but is cast as supporting character Ilse.
 Rarmian Newton as Maashous Evers, a homeless student who is the lighting designer for the drama club
 Casey Johnson as Gordy Mazzuchelli, Lou's son, who is having problems with alcohol
 Taylor Richardson as Kaitlin Mazzuchelli, Lou's daughter

Recurring
 Ellie Desautels as Michael Hallowell, a transgender student, previously a member of Stanton's choir and now a new member of Stanton's drama club, cast in the role of Moritz.
 Shannon Purser as Annabelle Bowman, a member of Stanton's drama club
 Sean Grandillo as Jeremy Travers, a new member of Stanton's drama club, cast in the role of Ernst, Simon's partner in the play
 Erin Kommor as Sasha Foley, a student in the drama troupe who get's pregnant, cast as Martha in the play.
 Nacho Tambunting as Francis, a student in the drama troupe, cast in the role of Georg.
 Katherine Reis as Jolene, a student in the drama troupe
 Rachel Hilson as Harmon Curtis, a student in the drama troupe
 Alexis Molnar as Lexi, a student in the drama troupe
 Tiffany Mann as Cheryl, a student in the drama troupe
 Caroline Pluta as Violet, a student in the drama troupe
 Sergio King as Clark, a student in the drama troupe
 Jennifer Ferrin as Denise Strickland, Gwen's mother who serves as costumer for Spring Awakening
 Stephanie J. Block as Patricia Saunders, Simon's mother
 Stephen Plunkett as Robert Saunders, Simon's father
 Mark Tallman as Detrell Thorne, Robbie's father
 Diallo Riddle as Andy Kranepool, a teacher at Stanton who is attracted to Tracey
 Tom Riis Farrell as Mr Baer, the Stanton High Band director
 Niloy Alam as Sundeep, the Stanton High guitarist 
 Billy Joe Kiessling as the Stanton High violist
 Sumi Yu as the Stanton High violinist
 Pance Pony as the Stanton High cellist
 Liam Herbert as the Stanton High acoustic guitar
 Chandler Swift as Stanton High cheerleader

Episodes
{{Episode table |background=#FFA500 |overall= |title= |director=Mike Cahill |writer= |airdate= |viewers=  |country=U.S. |episodes=

{{Episode list
 |EpisodeNumber   = 5
 |Title           = We've All Got Our Junk
 |DirectedBy      = Patrick Norris
 |WrittenBy       = Ian Deitchman & Kristin Robinson
 |OriginalAirDate = 
 |Viewers         = 4.40<ref name="1.05">{{cite web |url=http://tvbythenumbers.zap2it.com/daily-ratings/tuesday-final-ratings-april-10-2018/ |archive-url=https://web.archive.org/web/20180412082800/http://tvbythenumbers.zap2it.com/daily-ratings/tuesday-final-ratings-april-10-2018/ |url-status=dead |archive-date=April 12, 2018 |title=Roseanne,' 'The Middle,' 'Lethal Weapon' adjust up, 'Black-ish' down: Tuesday final ratings |work=TV by the Numbers |last=Porter |first=Rick |date=April 11, 2018 |accessdate=April 11, 2018}}</ref>
 |ShortSummary    = Gordy is found by his parents and a fight ensues; some ground rules are laid out; Lou later tells Gordy about Gordy's alcoholic grandfather. Meanwhile, some relationships are tested. Gwen's parents are getting divorced. Robbie and Lilette are torn as to whether they should remain friends or get more serious about their relationship, though Robbie's father disapproves of Lilette. But they decide to be together, which in turn helps with their performance for the musical's love scene. Musical personalities collide during rehearsals, but both instructors come to an agreement after listening to instrumental versions of "My Junk". Simon is allowed to return to Stanton High. Lilette's mother Vanessa violently retaliates against her boss' continual inappropriate touching.
 |LineColor       = FFA500
}}
 
 
 
 
 
}}

Music
The show had cast members perform songs from Spring Awakening, including the new song "All You Desire" that Spring Awakening creators Duncan Sheik and Steven Sater wrote specifically for the show.

Rise Season 1: The Album
On May 11, 2018, a soundtrack from the series was released. It included all Spring Awakening songs performed by the cast, as well as covers of Ed Sheeran's "Perfect", Alessia Cara's "Scars to Your Beautiful", Fun's "Carry On" and Macklemore's "Glorious". The album consists of 24 tracks.

Reception
Critical response
The review aggregator website Rotten Tomatoes reported an approval rating of 59% based on 41 reviews, with an average rating of 6.22/10. Metacritic, which uses a weighted average, assigned the series a score of 59 out of 100 based on 27 reviews, indicating "mixed or average reviews". Out magazine expressed concern about straightwashing, saying that the changing of the original book's real-life source, about a gay man, into a straight man, was "cultural theft and [gay] erasure" of what "should have been the story of a complicated LGBTQ hero".

In 2020, Rosie Perez gave her thoughts about the show's cancellation: "I think that it didn't have enough time, but I also think, to be fair, it was a little too over sentimental. I think that's what hurt the show. Everyone kept comparing it to Glee'', and that hurt the show, as well."

Ratings

References

External links
 
 

2018 American television series debuts
2018 American television series endings
2010s American high school television series
2010s American LGBT-related drama television series
2010s American teen drama television series
American musical television series
English-language television shows
NBC original programming
Television series about educators
Television series about teenagers
Television shows set in Pennsylvania
Television shows based on books
Television series by Universal Television
Works about performing arts education